John L. Morgan, nicknamed "Pepper", is an American former Negro league outfielder who played in the 1930s.

Morgan made his Negro leagues debut in 1937 with the Indianapolis Athletics and Memphis Red Sox. He played for Memphis again the following season.

References

External links
 and Seamheads

Year of birth missing
Place of birth missing
Indianapolis Athletics players
Memphis Red Sox players
Baseball outfielders